Syndipnus is a genus of parasitoid wasps belonging to the family Ichneumonidae.

The species of this genus are found in Europe and Northern America.

Species:
 Syndipnus abbreviatus Roman, 1909 
 Syndipnus alaskensis Walley, 1940

References

Ichneumonidae
Ichneumonidae genera